Victor John Philips (born 1 September 1950) is a retired Indian professional field hockey player. A former captain who played as a Right Out, he led the Indian national team during the 1978 World Cup, and was a member of the side that won its 1975 edition. He was also a part of the bronze medal-winning squad at the 1972 Munich Olympics. Philips's older brother John Peter represented India at three Olympic Games from 1960 to 1968, winning silver, gold and bronze medals respectively.

About his game, S. Dinakar of The Hindu wrote, "The striking aspects of Philips' game were his speed – he used to practice sprints regularly – and the ability to dribble. Time and again he would leave the defenders in a daze, cutting in dangerously from the right to score or producing defence- splitting crosses. He had his own style of converting penalty strokes, taking a step back, before moving up to push." Mir Ranjan Negi called him "one of the best outside rights India ever produced." In recognition of his contribution to field hockey, Philips was given the award for lifetime achievement by the government of India in 2000.

References

External links 
 
 
 

1950 births
Indian male field hockey players
Field hockey players from Tamil Nadu
Olympic field hockey players of India
Olympic medalists in field hockey
Field hockey players at the 1976 Summer Olympics
Asian Games medalists in field hockey
Field hockey players at the 1974 Asian Games
Field hockey players at the 1978 Asian Games
Asian Games silver medalists for India
Medalists at the 1974 Asian Games
Medalists at the 1978 Asian Games
Living people
1978 Men's Hockey World Cup players
Medalists at the 1972 Summer Olympics
Olympic bronze medalists for India
Recipients of the Arjuna Award